The 2010–11 SC Freiburg season is the club's 13th season in the Bundesliga, the highest division in German football, and the second consecutive season since promotion in 2009. It is the club's fourth season with Robin Dutt as manager.
The season began on 28 June with a first training session.

Transfers
Freiburg has had a few squad changes over the summer. A total of 11 players left the club over the summer transfer period, most notably Cha Du-ri and Mohamadou Idrissou, who join Celtic and Borussia Mönchengladbach respectively after their contracts had expired. Incoming to the club were Jan Rosenthal from Hannover 96, Maximilian Nicu from Hertha BSC and Zvonko Pamić on loan from Bayer Leverkusen. Additionally, Alain Junior Ollé Ollé returned from his loan spell at Rot Weiss Ahlen, whilst Nicolas Höfler and Danny Williams were moved up from the club's reserve squad. Towards the end of the summer transfer period, the club made multiple further additions by bringing in Kisho Yano and Anton Putsila.

Summer transfers

In:

Out:

Winter transfers

In:

Out:

Competitions

Bundesliga

League table

Results by round

Matches

DFB-Pokal

1st round

2nd round

Players

Current squad

|}

Goals
(League only)

Scorers
22 Goals
Papiss Cissé
5 Goals
Jan Rosenthal
4 Goals
Stefan Reisinger
3 Goals
Julian Schuster
2 Goals
Johannes Flum
1 Goal
Oliver Barth
Heiko Butscher

Own Goals for
Edson Braafheid (Bayern Munich)
Mats Hummels (Borussia Dortmund)
Adam Nemec (1. FC Kaiserslautern)
Own Goals against
Mensur Mujdža (vs. Borussia Dortmund)

Assists
8 Assists
Felix Bastians
5 Assists
Maximilian Nicu
Stefan Reisinger
4 Assists
Cédric Makiadi
3 Assists
Julian Schuster
2 Assists
Heiko Butscher
Daniel Caligiuri
Anton Putsila
1 Assist
Oliver Barth
Oliver Baumann
Papiss Cissé
Jonathan Jäger
Erik Jendrišek
Kisho Yano

Bookings
(League only)

Yellow cards
8 Yellow Cards
Papiss Cissé
Mensur Mujdža
6 Yellow Cards
Anton Putsila
4 Yellow Cards
Yacine Abdessadki
3 Yellow Cards
Oliver Barth
Heiko Butscher
Julian Schuster
2 Yellow Cards
Daniel Caligiuri
Stefan Reisinger
Ömer Toprak
1 Yellow Card
Felix Bastians
Johannes Flum
Cédric Makiadi
Simon Pouplin
Jan Rosenthal

Red cards
1 Red Card
Ivica Banović (vs. Schalke 04)
Pavel Krmaš (vs. 1899 Hoffenheim)
Ömer Toprak (vs. Borussia Mönchengladbach)

Management and coaching staff 

Since the beginning of the 2007–08 season Robin Dutt is the manager of SC Freiburg.

On 20 March 2011, it was announced that Robin Dutt would be leaving SC Freiburg to join Bayer Leverkusen as coach at the end of the season. Marcus Sorg will replace Dutt for the 2011–12 season.

Kits

References

External links 
SC Freiburg Official Website in German

German football clubs 2010–11 season
2010-11